Athina-Theodora Alexopoulou (born 17 March 1983 in Athens) is a Greek sprint canoer who competed in the mid-2000s. At the 2004 Summer Olympics in Athens, she was eliminated in the semifinals of the K-1 500 m event.

References
 Sports-Reference.com profile

1983 births
Living people
Greek female canoeists
Canoeists at the 2004 Summer Olympics
Olympic canoeists of Greece
Sportspeople from Athens